Daniel Hernández Jr. (born January 25, 1990) is an American politician and former member of the Arizona House of Representatives. A member of the Arizona Democratic Party, he served alongside Rosanna Gabaldón in Legislative District 2. Hernández interned for U.S. Representative Gabby Giffords and was present when she was shot during a 2011 constituent meeting. He has been credited with helping to save Giffords's life after the incident.

Early life and education
Hernandez was born in 1990 to Daniel Hernandez Sr. and Consuelo Quiñones Hernandez, a working-class family in Tucson, Arizona. He has two younger sisters, Consuelo and Alma Hernandez.

In 2008, Hernandez volunteered for the Hillary Clinton 2008 presidential campaign and Gabby Giffords' re-election campaign. He graduated from Sunnyside High School in 2008. Hernandez earned a Bachelor of Arts degree in political science and a Master of Legal Studies from the University of Arizona.

Career 
In 2011, while a student at the University of Arizona, Hernandez worked as an intern in the office of Gabby Giffords. During the first week of his internship, Hernandez helped organize a "Congress on your Corner" event, which was the site of the 2011 Tucson shooting. After Giffords was shot in the head, Hernandez held her up and stanched the bleeding with his hand until employees from the nearby grocery store brought him clean smocks. In doing so, he is credited with saving the congresswoman's life. Later that year, he was elected to the board of the Sunnyside Unified School District.

Arizona Legislature
In 2016, Hernandez ran for the Arizona House of Representatives. He defeated Republican incumbent J. Christopher Ackerley in the general election alongside Democratic incumbent Rosanna Gabaldón. Together, Hernandez and Gabaldon won the two seats of the Arizona House's 2nd District, with Hernandez receiving 32,651 votes. Hernandez and Gabaldon had previously defeated Aaron Baumann in the Democratic primary.

He is one of three openly gay members of the Arizona State Legislature, alongside Cesar Chavez and Robert Meza and is a co-founder of the LGBTQ Caucus in Arizona.

Hernandez endorsed a 2016 ballot measure to legalize recreational marijuana in Arizona.

On May 20, 2021, Hernandez announced his candidacy in the 2022 United States House of Representatives elections in Arizona in the 6th congressional district. He lost to Kirsten Engel in the Democratic primary.

Political positions 
Hernández has described himself as "pragmatic" and has expressed willingness to collaborate with Republicans.

The Arizona Sierra Club gave Hernández's voting record an A rating from 2017-2019 and a B rating from 2020-2021.

Hernández is strongly supportive of Israel and has described himself as a "pro-Israel activist."

Hernández has expressed support for increasing government presence at the Mexico–United States border through the use of drones, sensors, and law enforcement officers (such as those of the United States Border Patrol).

Personal life
Hernandez's maternal grandfather was a Mexican Jew. His family are members of a synagogue. Hernandez is openly gay.

References

External links

 Campaign website
 Biography at Ballotpedia

1990 births
21st-century American Jews
21st-century American politicians
21st-century LGBT people
American people of Mexican-Jewish descent
Candidates in the 2022 United States House of Representatives elections
Hispanic and Latino American state legislators in Arizona
Gay politicians
Jewish American people in Arizona politics
LGBT Hispanic and Latino American people
LGBT state legislators in Arizona
Living people
Democratic Party members of the Arizona House of Representatives
Politicians from Tucson, Arizona
University of Arizona alumni
Hernandez family